This is a timeline of women's suffrage in Arizona. The first women's suffrage bill was brought forward in the Arizona Territorial legislature in 1883, but it did not pass. Suffragists work to influence the Territorial Constitutional Convention in 1891 and lose the women's suffrage battle by only three votes. That year, the Arizona Suffrage Association is formed. In 1897, taxpaying women gain the right to vote in school board elections. Suffragists both from Arizona and around the country continue to lobby the territorial legislature and organize women's suffrage groups. In 1903, a women's suffrage bill passes, but is vetoed by the governor. In 1910, suffragists work to influence the Arizona State Constitutional Convention, but are also unsuccessful. When Arizona becomes a state on February 14, 1912, an attempt to legislate a women's suffrage amendment to the Arizona Constitution fails. Frances Munds mounts a successful ballot initiative campaign. On November 5, 1912, women's suffrage passes in Arizona. In 1913, the voter registration books are opened to women. In 1914, women participate in their first primary elections. Arizona ratified the Nineteenth Amendment on February 12, 1920. However, Native American women and Latinas would wait longer for full voting rights.

19th century

1880s 
1883

 Murat Masterson of Prescott introduces a partial women's suffrage bill for women to vote in school board elections, but it fails.
1884

 The first Arizona chapter of the Women's Christian Temperance Union (WCTU) is formed.
1887

 The Arizona Woman's Equal Rights Association (AWERA) is founded in Phoenix.

1890s 
1891

Josephine Brawley Hughes and Laura M. Johns testify on women's suffrage at the Territorial Constitutional Convention.
Women's suffrage fails at the convention by 3 votes.
Hughes is part of the founding of the Arizona Suffrage Association.
1895

 Johns speaks in Phoenix, Tempe, and Tucson on women's suffrage.

1896

 January: Hughes attends the National American Woman Suffrage Association (NAWSA) Convention in Washington, D.C.

1897

 Johns addresses the territorial legislature on women's suffrage.
A bill is passed that allows women taxpayers to vote in school board elections.

1899

 Carrie Chapman Catt visits Phoenix to advocate for women's suffrage.
A women's suffrage bill passes the lower house of the legislature.
The school board suffrage law is declared invalid by the Arizona Territorial Supreme Court.

20th century

1900s 
1901

 Lida P. Robinson works to promote a women's suffrage bill, but it does not pass.

1902

 A women's suffrage convention is held in Phoenix.

1903

 Governor Alexander Oswald Brodie vetoes the women's suffrage bill.
1905

 The women's suffrage movement in Arizona stalls, even as NAWSA sends field worker, Mary C. C. Bradford, to revive interest.

1909

 Laura Clay and Frances Munds lobby the territorial legislature on women's suffrage, but the suffrage bill does not pass.
The territorial legislature passes a literacy test law, which is supported by the Arizona Equal Suffrage Association.

1910s 
1910

 Laura Gregg from NAWSA is sent to Arizona to continue organizing suffrage groups around the state.
 October 10: The Arizona Constitutional Convention meets.
Suffragists lobby the delegates for women's suffrage to be added to the constitution, but are unsuccessful.

1912

 February 14: Arizona becomes a state.
A women's suffrage amendment bill fails in the Arizona State Legislature by one vote.
Munds starts a petition campaign to get women's suffrage on the November ballot.
July 5: Munds gets more than 4,000 signatures, enough to get the women's suffrage initiative on the ballot.
October: Suffragists have a women's suffrage booth at the Arizona State Fair.
November 5: Women's equal suffrage becomes part of the Constitution of Arizona.
Another literacy test law is passed, reducing the number of Mexican American voters.
1913

 January: The Arizona State Legislature hold an emergency session and passes a bill opening the voter registration books to women.
 March 15: Women in Arizona are allowed to register to vote for all elections.

May: NAWSA holds a celebratory parade in New York City for Arizona, Kansas, and Oregon granting women's suffrage. Madge Udall represents Arizona.

1914

 Women participate in the Arizona primary elections.
Congressional Union organizers, Josephine Casey and Jane Pincus, come to Arizona.

1916

 April 20: The Suffrage Special stops briefly in Maricopa and then arrives in Tucson.
 April 21: The  Suffrage Special arrives in Phoenix.

1920s 
1920

 February 12: Special legislative session convened to ratify the Nineteenth Amendment. It is ratified the same day.

1924

 Native Americans gain United States Citizenship.

1940s 
1948

 The ban on Native Americans voting in Arizona is overturned by the Arizona Supreme Court.

1960s 
1965

 The Voting Right Act helps Latina voters exercise their right to vote in Arizona.

1970s 
1970

 English literacy tests for voting are outlawed in the state.

See also 

 List of Arizona suffragists
 Women's suffrage in Arizona
 Women's suffrage in states of the United States
 Women's suffrage in the United States

References

Sources 

 

Arizona suffrage
Politics of Arizona
Timelines of states of the United States
Suffrage referendums
American suffragists
History of women's rights in the United States
History of women in Arizona